Tatiana Vasilyevna Voronova (born December 24, 1955, in Arkhangelsk Oblast, Russian Soviet Federative Socialist Republic) is a Soviet/Latvian chess player who holds the FiDE title of Woman International Master (1993). She won the Latvian Chess Championship for women in 1980, 1985, 1986, and 1987.

Chess career
Tatiana Voronova started to play chess at the age of 14 but progressed rapidly. In 1978 she won a bronze medal in the Women's Soviet Chess Championship in Nikolayev. In 1980 played for Latvian team "Daugava" in Soviet Team Chess Cup First league in Rostov-on-Don she shown the best women board results - 4,5 from 5. During the period from 1980 to 2006 Tatiana Voronova participated in Latvian women's chess championships. She won this tournament four times: in 1980, 1985, 1986 and 1987. In 1982, 1998, 1999, 2000 and 2003 she obtained a second place, and she came in third place six times: in 1993, 1994, 1996, 1997, 2001 and 2006. 

Tatiana Voronova played for Latvia in Soviet Team chess championships:
 In 1979, at first women board in the 14th Soviet Team Chess Championship in Moscow (+2 −2 =4);
 In 1981, at first women board in the 15th Soviet Team Chess Championship in Moscow (+2 −4 =3);

Tatiana Voronova played for Latvia in Chess Olympiads:
 In 1994, at first reserve board in the 31st Chess Olympiad in Moscow (+5 −0 =4);
 In 1996, at first reserve board in the 32nd Chess Olympiad in Yerevan (+4 −1 =5);
 In 1998, at second board in the 33rd Chess Olympiad in Elista (+3 −2 =6);
 In 2000, at second board in the 34th Chess Olympiad in Istanbul (+5 −3 =4).

Tatiana Voronova played for Latvia in European Team Chess Championship (women):
 In 1997, at reserve board in 2nd European Team Chess Championship (women) in Pula (+4 −1 =2);
 In 2001, at second board in 4th European Team Chess Championship (women) in León (+1 −2 =2).

In 1978 Tatjana Voronova has graduated from the Russian Institute of Physical Culture and works as a trainer.

References

 Žuravļevs, N.; Dulbergs, I.; Kuzmičovs, G. (1980), Latvijas šahistu jaunrade, Rīga, Avots., pp. 97 (in Latvian).

External links
 
 
 
 

1955 births
Living people
Soviet emigrants to Latvia
Latvian female chess players
Soviet female chess players
Chess Woman International Masters
Sportspeople from Arkhangelsk
Russian State University of Physical Education, Sport, Youth and Tourism, Department of Chess alumni